Bharanikkavu Sivakumar (died 24 January 2007) was an Indian lyricist from Kerala who worked in Malayalam film industry. 

He is the grandson of Mahakavi Azhakathu Padmanabha Kuruppu, the first great poet of the Malayalam poetry 'Ramachandra Vilasas'. His first movie as a lyricist was Chenda in 1973. He went on to write 272 songs for 88 Malayalam films.

Sivakumar died of a heart attack on 24 January 2007, he was aged 60.

Filmography 
 Chenda (1973) - Panchamithirunaal

 Swimming Pool (1976) -  Sumangalaathira Rathri
Narakasuran (2006)

References 

Indian male songwriters
20th-century Indian composers
Malayalam-language lyricists
Film musicians from Kerala
21st-century Indian composers
Year of birth missing
2007 deaths
20th-century male musicians
21st-century male musicians